This is a list of presidents of the American Osler Society.

1970-1980

1981-1990

1990-2000

2000-2010

2010-2020

2000 onwards

References

Lists of presidents of organizations
William Osler